The Moravian Diet (earlier Moravský stavovský sněm), was legislature  of Moravia,  the Diet, or general assembly, of the Estates of the Margraviate of Moravia and emerged from the earlier informal assemblies, known as Moravian corporate Diet (or Diet of estates of Moravian Land).

History 
First session in 1254 convened to Brno  by king Přemysl Otakar II. Regular session started since 1288, and met alternately in Brno and in Olomouc (both Dominican cloister). Since 1663 sessioned only in Brno .

The liberal constitution 
In the Year of revolution 1848 (Spring of Nations) was from 31. May 1848 until 21. January 1849  held (so called) Moravian constitutional assembly. In 19.September 1848 was by this assembly adopted Moravian Constitution (German: Der Ferfassung für das Markgrafthum Mähren, Czech: Zřízení pro Markrabství Moravské). This complies with the principles of the Federal Constitution and state representative government and civil liberties. Later this proposal was not ratified by Emperor Francis Joseph I.

Moravian Compromise 
On November 27, 1905, leading members in Moravian Diet of the Czech (speaking) and German (speaking) communities in Moravia agreed to a political compromise that divided power in the provincial diet between Czechs, Germans, and members of the landowning and ecclesiastical aristocracy.
The Moravian Compromise was one of the few positive examples of an approach to a fair solution in the field of nationalities policies. Despite the deadlock in the language dispute between Czechs and Germans, a compromise acceptable to both sides and allowing a harmonious coexistence was found here.

The Moravian Compromise of 1905  was a root a compromise over what national equality of rights meant. The Czech and German understanding of it, and the compromise between them, even found numerical expression — in the proportions set be by Compromise for staffing nationally shared public institutions, such as crownland legistrature and administration, and for funding nationally partitioned ones, such as school.

The electoral conditions were altered so as to include in addition to the three electoral classes of the great landowners, the taxpayers in urban areas, and the taxpayers in rural districts a fourth universal electoral class consisting of every qualified voter; separate German and Czech electoral districts were established according to the national land registers, and Curia of the separate nationalities were instituted to settle all disputes involving the question on nationality. The question of language in the case of the autonomous national and district authorities had been settled on a bilingual basis, and the division of the school board according to nationality accomplished. Although, by the acceptance of this franchise reform, the Germans lost their previous majority in the Diet, they gave their consent to the change in the interests of public peace.
Politically speaking the Margraviate of Moravia was an Austrian crown land, the highest administrative authority being vested in the governor at Brno. The Diet consisted of 149 deputies: 2 members with individual vote, the Archbishop of Olomouc and the Bishop of Brno; 30 members of the landed interests (10 German, 20 Czech); 3 deputies from the Chamber of Commerce of Brno and from that of Olomouc; 40 representatives of the towns (20 German, 20 Czech); 51 representatives of the rural communes (14 German); 20 deputies from the electoral curia (6 German). In the Reichsrat (Imperial parliament in Vienna) of the Austrian Crownlands, Moravia was represented by 49 deputies.

References

External links

Diet
Legislatures of Austria-Hungary